Alegia is a town located in the province of Gipuzkoa, in the autonomous community of Basque Country, in the North of Spain. In 2014 Alegia had a total population of 1,744.

References

External links
 Official Website Information available in Spanish and Basque.
 ALEGIA in the Bernardo Estornés Lasa - Auñamendi Encyclopedia (Euskomedia Fundazioa) Information available in Spanish
 Tontokaletik mundura!!!

Municipalities in Gipuzkoa